Qasba Abbatabad is a union council of Abbottabad District in Khyber-Pakhtunkhwa province of Pakistan. According to the 2017 Census of Pakistan, the population is 3,189.

Subdivisions
 Qasba Abbatabad
 Rakh Civil Military

References

Union councils of Abbottabad District